Naphthol Red (Pigment red 170 or PR170) is an organic pigment extensively used in automotive coatings and painting. 

It is produced synthetically by converting p-aminobenzamide into the corresponding diazonium compound followed by coupling with 3-hydroxy-2-naphththoic acid (2-ethoxy)anilide ("Naphtol AS-PH" dye precursor).

In the solid state the hydrazo tautomer forms and several crystal structures exist. In the initial α polymorph the molecules are arranged in a herringbone pattern with extensive hydrogen bonding. The φ polymorph is more dense and more stable and produced industrially by thermal treatment in water at 130°C under pressure. In this phase the molecules are planar and arranged in layers. Extensive hydrogen bonding exists within the layer but between layers the only interactions are Van der Waals forces. Dense crystal structures are preferred for pigments used in coatings because in the event of photochemical decomposition the fragments are locked in place and are able to recombine. Research shows that by replacing the ethoxy group in this compound by a methoxy group the crystal structure is less stable and in the final application and the color fades more easily. By careful selection of substituents it is possible to optimize crystal structure and improve optical properties .

References 
  Crystal Structures of Pigment Red 170 and Derivatives, as Determined by X-ray Powder Diffraction  Martin U. Schmidt, Detlef W. M. Hofmann, Christian Buchsbaum, Hans Joachim Metz, Angewandte Chemie International Edition Volume 45, Issue 8, Pages 1313 - 1317 2006 Abstract

Pigments
Organic pigments